Disk Original Group (ディスク・オリジナル・グループ, Disuku Orijinaru Grūpu), usually abbreviated to DOG, was a video game development collective of seven companies led by Square. Together with six other companies that developed primarily for personal computers, they released numerous titles for the Famicom Disk System in the mid-to-late 1980s.

History 

DOG was established in July 1986 with the aim of allowing the seven then-fledgling companies to develop independently for the Famicom with pooled financial resources. 

At the time of its formation, the only member with any prior involvement in the Famicom market was Square. DOG was unusual in that its other six members, active since the early days of PC gaming, were primarily developers of computer role-playing games and adventure games.

Square were responsible for all sales and marketing under the DOG label, while the other six companies handled development and managed intellectual property rights. In-game copyright notices retained the name of the original developer, with DOG titles bearing the Square name having been developed by Square themselves. DOG and Square shared a Famicom licensee code.

All except Square and Carry Lab had previously worked together on Gall Force: Eternal Story under the name Session 61, in addition to founding another collective known as ScapTrust. The other three companies involved in the ScapTrust venture — Bothtec, BPS and SystemSoft — did not join DOG as they were already active in the Famicom market.

In 1988, when all seven companies had developed at least one title, the DOG brand came to a natural end. Factors contributing to the demise of DOG include higher-capacity cartridges and battery backup saves beginning to take hold in the industry, as well as Disk System development generally falling out of favour.

Members 

The seven consistuent companies of DOG were:

 Square (leader)
 Carry Lab
 XTALSOFT
 System Sacom
 Thinking Rabbit
 HummingBirdSoft (Apple Mac division)
 Microcabin

As of 2021, two of these companies — System Sacom and Microcabin — are still in existence, although all seven have withdrawn from video game development, with Square having since merged with Enix to form Square Enix.

Games developed 

A total of eleven games were released under the DOG brand.

 Square

 Suishō no Dragon
 The 3-D Battles of WorldRunner
 Apple Town Monogatari
 Cleopatra no Mahō

 Carry Lab

 Mystery Quest

 XTALSOFT

 Kalin no Tsurugi

 System Sacom

 Moon Ball Magic

 Thinking Rabbit

 Jikai Shōnen Mettomag

 HummingBirdSoft

 Deep Dungeon series
 Deep Dungeon: Madō Senki
 Yūki no Monshō: Deep Dungeon II

 Microcabin

 Akū Senki Raijin

Cancelled games 

 Square

 Seiken Densetsu: The Emergence of Excalibur

 Intended to release in 1987 as the first of a pentalogy, but ultimately cancelled. The Seiken Densetsu name and trademark were later reused for the entirely unrelated 1991 Game Boy game Seiken Densetsu: Final Fantasy Gaiden (known in North America as Final Fantasy Adventure and in Europe as Mystic Quest), the first entry in what would come to be known as the Mana series.

References

See also 

 Japan Computer Game Association

Organizations established in 1986
Square Enix
Defunct video game companies
Defunct video game companies of Japan